The Maddale also called Mrudanga(ಮೃದಂಗ) in North Canara region is a percussion instrument from Karnataka, India. It is the primary rhythmic accompaniment in a Yakshagana ensemble along with Chande. Maddale also represents a remarkable progress in percussive instruments as it produces the perfectly hormonic tonic (shruti swara) when played anywhere on the surface compared to Mrudangam, Pakawaj or Tabla that can not produce the tonic (shruti) on all parts of the drum surface. The traditional variety of Maddale was 30 cm long, had 8 inch drum head for right and produced the louder sound. These days 6 - 6.5 inch wide right side maddale is used with only a few using 7 inch wide. Left bass side is about an inch (few hairs less) bigger than right. Maddale is available in more than three different variations.  Maddale used in Yakshagana looks similar to mridangam but is markedly different in structure, acoustics, playing techniques and the rhythm system (Yakshagana Tala).

History
Maddale belongs to mridangam family of drums and hence shares the history of similar drums. Its drum head is similar to tabla and the drum itself is similar to pakhavaj. Over the years, the Maddale evolved to be made of different kinds of wood and for higher octave, and today, its body is constructed from wood of the jackfruit tree among other woods like kakke, baine, hunaalu. Its use has evolved with the development of Yakshagana and Yakshaganic fingering and hand techniques have been developed. Use of palm produces a sound that is somewhat a mixture of pakhawaj and mridangam.

Physical components

The maddale is a double-sided drum whose body is usually made using a hollowed piece of jackfruit wood about half a cm thick (this is very thin compared to Mrudangam). This body is called Goodu(or housing). The two open ends of the drum are covered with a goat skin leather and laced to each other with leather straps around the circumference of the drum. These straps are stretched to tightly hold the drum heads on either side of the drum body, allowing them to resonate when struck.  The drum head on the left is slightly larger (bass side) (about say 90% of an inch). One side produces bass another treble. The drum head is known as muchchige.

The bass drum head is known as the eda muchchige and the drum head is known as the bala muchchige. The right drum head is similar to tabla drum head but differs slightly creating a major tonal difference. The maddale unlike Mrudangam, Parkwaj or Tabla produces tonic when playing on the rim and on ink. The left drum head produces lower pitched bass sounds. The right drum head has a circular disk in the centre called karne or the ink causing the drum to produce harmonic tones. The left drum is smeared with a tuning paste made from ash and rice called bona, before the performance to dampen the tone and to produce bass sound.

Methods of use
Maddale is tuned to the tonic of the Yakshagana singer before the performance (lower shadja). A wooden peg is sometimes used to tighten the leather straps. Two major strokes are called Gumpu and Chapu. Playing on the rim is called Chapu this is used for tuning. Playing on the ink to produce a more resonating sound is called Gumpu. The cross finger stroke above the ink is called the Kapala stroke which is a unique stroke that produces a hormonic mix of Gumpu and chapu (a stroke different from are chapu of mrudangam - Kapala is more musical in quality).

See also
 Tabla
 Thavil
 Karatalas
 Chande
 Tala-Maddale
 Mridanga

References

Yakshagana
Carnatic music instruments
Hand drums
Pitched percussion instruments
Indian musical instruments